Calaum Jahraldo-Martin (born 27 April 1993) is an  English businessman Co-founder of FirstLuxe and a former professional Footballer. ex Antigua and Barbuda international footballer who played as a defender.

Early life
Jahraldo-Martin lived in England, Antigua and Jamaica before moving to back to England to live in Harrow, at the age of 11. After missing a trial at Brighton & Hove Albion due to illness he joined FootballCV and attended trials days at Rushden & Diamonds, Newcastle United, Brentford and Barnet. Following the trials days, Jahraldo-Martin received interest from Conference South side Boreham Wood and went on to sign for them. During his time at FootballCV he received the FootballCV Academy Player of the Year Award.

Club career
Jahraldo-Martin joined Isthmian League Division One South side Dulwich Hamlet in 2012 and during the 2012–13 season, scored 2 goals in 20 league appearances for the Greater London club as they went on to win promotion to the Isthmian League Premier Division. His impressive performances resulted in a 2-week trial at Championship side Hull City in which Jahraldo-Martin played for the Hull City Reserves. Hull manager Steve Bruce was impressed with the youngsters performance and signed him in March 2013. On the transfer, Bruce said: "He's been a breath of fresh air and who knows, we might just have unearthed a little gem." He made his Hull City debut in a League Cup match against League One side Leyton Orient on 27 August 2013, coming on as a substitute for Nick Proschwitz in the 67th minute.

On 20 November 2014, he went out on loan to Tranmere Rovers until 1 January 2015.
He made his debut on 22 November 2014 in a 1–2 defeat at home to Southend United.

On 27 January 2015, Jahraldo-Martin signed for Scottish Championship club Alloa Athletic on loan until the end of the 2014–15 season.

On 2 January 2016, Jahraldo-Martin joined Leyton Orient on a one-month loan deal, He scored his first football league goal in a 2–0 away win at Wycombe Wanderers and his loan was extended for the remainder of the 2015–16 season.

On 12 August 2016, Jahraldo-Martin signed a short-term deal with Oldham Athletic.

On 3 August 2017, Jahraldo-Martin signed a one-year deal with League Two side Newport County after a successful pre-season trial period. He made his debut for Newport on the opening day of the 2017–18 season, as a second-half substitute in a 3–3 draw at Stevenage. He was released by Newport at the end of the 2017–18 season.

International career
In late August 2014, Jahraldo-Martin committed to representing Antigua and Barbuda internationally and joined the squad as they prepared for the first round of 2014 Caribbean Cup qualification. Jahraldo-Martin made his international debut in Antigua's first match of the tournament, a 6–0 victory over Anguilla. He also scored his first international goal in the match, opening Antigua's scoring in the eighth minute.

International goals
As of match played 7 June 2016. Antigua and Barbuda score listed first, score column indicates score after each Jahraldo-Martin goal.

Career statistics

Club

References

External links
 
 

1993 births
Living people
Antigua and Barbuda footballers
English footballers
English sportspeople of Antigua and Barbuda descent
Association football forwards
Boreham Wood F.C. players
Dulwich Hamlet F.C. players
Hull City A.F.C. players
Tranmere Rovers F.C. players
Leyton Orient F.C. players
Oldham Athletic A.F.C. players
Isthmian League players
English Football League players
Antigua and Barbuda international footballers
Antigua and Barbuda expatriate footballers
Antigua and Barbuda expatriate sportspeople in England
Expatriate footballers in England
2014 Caribbean Cup players
Alloa Athletic F.C. players
Newport County A.F.C. players
Scottish Professional Football League players
Antigua and Barbuda expatriate sportspeople in Wales